Giacomo Antonio Arland (c. 1668–1743) was an Italian painter of the Baroque period. He was born in Genoa, and at age 20, he traveled to Paris, where he was patronized by the Duke of Orleans. He became renowned as a portrait miniature painter. He returns in 1729 to Genoa, as a wealthy man.

References

1668 births
1743 deaths
Portrait miniaturists
17th-century Italian painters
Italian male painters
18th-century Italian painters
Painters from Genoa
Italian Baroque painters
18th-century Italian male artists